Lucien Nat (born Lucien Maurice Natte; 11 January  1895 – 25 July 1972) was a French film, stage and television actor. He was married to the actress Marie Déa.

Selected filmography

 Fun in the Barracks (1932) - Maréchal des Logis chef Barnot
 Les Misérables (1934) - Montparnasse
 The Tender Enemy (1936) - Le Promis
 Boissière (1937) - Jean Le Barois
 The Cheat (1937) - Maître Ribeyre
 Rasputin (1938) - Ostrowski
 Le corsaire (1939)
 Camp Thirteen (1940) - Carlos
 The Last of the Six (1941) - Marcel Gernicot
 Les affaires sont les affaires (1942) - Lucien Garraud
 Pontcarral (1942) - Garron
 The Heart of a Nation (1943) - Bernard Froment adulte
 Des jeunes filles dans la nuit (1943) - Le père d'Andrée
 Captain Fracasse (1943) - Agostin / Agostino
 Mermoz (1943) - Julien Pranville
 Le Bossu (1944) - Jean de Peyrolles
 Lunegarde (1946) - Monsieur de Lunegarde
 Patrie (1946) - La duc d'Albe
 Martin Roumagnac (1946) - Rimbaut - l'adjoint au maire, ancien amant de Blanche
 The Unknown Singer (1947) - Carray Mas
 The Revenge of Baccarat (1947) - Andrea
 Rocambole (1947) - Andrea
 Nine Boys, One Heart (1948) - Le monsieur
 Fort de la solitude (1948) - Le capitaine
 The Mystery of the Yellow Room (1949) - Robert Darzac
 Return to Life (1949) - Charles (segment 1 : "Le retour de tante Emma")
 The Perfume of the Lady in Black (1949) - Robert Darzac
 The Paris Waltz (1950) - Napoléon III (uncredited)
 Cartouche, King of Paris (1950) - M. de Cellamare
 The Convict (1951) - Messner
 We Are All Murderers (1952) - L'avocat général
 Imperial Violets (1952) - (uncredited)
 The Last Robin Hood (1953) - Antoine Lévêque
 Little Jacques (1953) - Le procureur
 Royal Affairs in Versailles (1954) - Montesquieu (uncredited)
 Le pain vivant (1955) - M. Valmont
 Black Dossier (1955) - Dr. Dessouche - le médecin légiste
 If Paris Were Told to Us (1956) - Montesquieu
 Reproduction interdite (1957) - Martinaud
 Police judiciaire (1958) - L'inspecteur Lanoux
 The Goose of Sedan (1959) - Captain
 Famous Love Affairs (1961) - Le préfet (segment "Comédiennes, Les") (uncredited)
 Le petit garçon de l'ascenseur (1962) - Le président
 Climats (1962) - M. Marcenat
 Thérèse Desqueyroux (1962) - Laroque
 Les amitiés particulières (1964) -  Le père supérieur / Father Superior
 Passeport diplomatique agent K 8 (1965) - Professeur Wilkowski

References

Bibliography
 McCann, Ben. Julien Duvivier. Oxford University Press, 2017.

External links

1895 births
1972 deaths
French male film actors
French male stage actors
Male actors from Paris